Banksia prolata is a species of bushy shrub that is endemic to Western Australia. It has linear, serrated or pinnatifid leaves, yellow flowers in heads of between 150 and 250, and egg-shaped follicles.

Description
Banksia prolata is a bushy shrub that grows to a height of  but does not form a lignotuber. There are between six and twenty-one sharply-pointed, triangular teeth on each side of the leaves.

Taxonomy and naming
This species was first formally described in 1810 by Robert Brown who gave it the name Dryandra longifolia and published the description in Transactions of the Linnean Society of London from material collected near Lucky Bay. The specific epithet (longifolia) is derived from the Latin words longus, "long" and folium, "leaf".

In 1996, Alex George described three subspecies of Dryandra longifolia in the journal Nuytsia:

In 2007 Austin Mast and Kevin Thiele transferred all dryandras to the genus Banksia, but since the name Banksia longifolia had already been used (Banksia longifolia Donn ex F.Dietr.), Mast and Thiele gave this species the name Banksia prolata. The epithet (prolata) is from a Latin word meaning "drawn out". The subspecies were named archeos, calcicola and prolata respectively. The names of the subspecies are accepted by the Australian Plant Census.

Distribution and habitat
Subspecies archeos grows among boulders in dense scrub on Mount Arid in the Cape Arid National Park, subspecies calcicola in scrub to the west of Esperance Bay and subspecies longifolia in scrub near granite slopes between Cape Le Grand to Cape Paisley in the Cape Le Grand National Park and on Mondrain Island in the Recherche Archipelago.

Conservation status
Banksia prolata is listed as "not threatened" by the Western Australian Government Department of Parks and Wildlife but subspecies archeos is listed as "Priority Two" meaning that it is poorly known and from only one or a few locations, subspecies calcicola as "Priority Four" meaning that is rare or near threatened and subspecies prolata as "Priority Three" meaning that it is poorly known and known from only a few locations but is not under imminent threat.

References

 

prolata
Plants described in 1810
Taxa named by Robert Brown (botanist, born 1773)